Idiomela subplicata is a species of medium-sized air-breathing land snail, a terrestrial pulmonate gastropods in the family Helicidae, the typical snails.

This species is endemic to the Madeira archipelago, Portugal, where it only occurs on the islet Ilhéu de Baixo off Porto Santo Island. 

It is mentioned in annexes II and IV of the Habitats Directive.

References

Further reading 
 T. D. A. Cockerell: The anatomy and relationships of Helix sublicata, Sowerby. - J. Mollus. Stud. 1921 14: 191-195.

Idiomela
Endemic fauna of Madeira
Molluscs of Madeira
Porto Santo Island
Gastropods described in 1824
Taxonomy articles created by Polbot